This is a list of properties and districts in Madison County, Georgia, that are listed on the National Register of Historic Places (NRHP).

Current listings

|}

References

Madison
Buildings and structures in Madison County, Georgia